The Gulf of Saint Euphemia is a gulf on the west coast of Calabria, southern Italy. It is part of the Tyrrhenian Sea and borders the province of Cosenza, the province of Catanzaro, and the province of Vibo Valentia.

Geography
The gulf extends from Campora San Giovanni in the north to Capo Vaticano in the south. The rivers Savuto, Amato, and Angitola flow into the gulf. Some of the important towns and cities near the gulf include Lamezia Terme, Vibo Valentia, and Tropea. The land bordering the gulf is mountainous in the north and south with a plain in the middle. A relatively narrow isthmus lies between the Gulf of Saint Euphemia and the Gulf of Squillace.

References

Gulfs of Italy
Gulfs of the Mediterranean
Landforms of the Tyrrhenian Sea
Landforms of Calabria
Cosenza
Catanzaro
Vibo Valentia